The sixth edition of the Tour of Flanders for Women cycling race was held on 5 April 2009. The race started in Oudenaarde and finished in Meerbeke, containing 11 climbs and two flat cobbled sections, covering a total distance of 130 km. It was the second leg of the 2009 UCI Women's Road World Cup. The race was won by German rider Ina-Yoko Teutenberg.

Race Summary
The race was animated by a break from Alona Andruk who gained up to three minutes but was caught before the Muur van Geraardsbergen. On the Muur, Marianne Vos, Emma Johansson, Noemi Cantele and Nicole Cooke broke clear. On the Bosberg, the quartet was joined by six other riders, when Marianne Vos attacked again. Cervélo TestTeam led the chase and caught Vos at 4 km from the finish. Ina-Yoko Teutenberg won the sprint ahead of Kirsten Wild and Emma Johansson.

Results

References

Tour of Flanders for Women
Tour
2009 UCI Women's Road World Cup